Mark Hine (born 18 May 1964) is an English former professional footballer who played as a midfielder. He made more than 250 appearances in the Football League.

Biography
Hine started his career at non-League clubs Billingham Town and Whitley Bay before signing for Grimsby Town in 1983.

After retiring from professional football, he played for Gateshead, Stalybridge Celtic, Spennymoor United, Whitley Bay, Goole, Harrogate Town, Armthorpe Welfare and Frickley Athletic, before returning to Armthorpe Welfare to become player-assistant manager in 2003. He also won caps for the England national football C team.

After leaving Armthorpe in 2006, he was a coach at Hatfield Main and Brodsworth Welfare.

References

External links
Mark Hine profile at the Post-War Players Database
Mark Hine Stalybridge Celtic

1964 births
Living people
English footballers
Association football midfielders
Billingham Town F.C. players
Whitley Bay F.C. players
Grimsby Town F.C. players
Darlington F.C. players
Peterborough United F.C. players
Scunthorpe United F.C. players
Doncaster Rovers F.C. players
Gateshead F.C. players
Spennymoor United F.C. players
Stalybridge Celtic F.C. players
Goole A.F.C. players
Harrogate Town A.F.C. players
Armthorpe Welfare F.C. players
Frickley Athletic F.C. players
England semi-pro international footballers